Elections to Burnley Borough Council in Lancashire, England were held on 3 May 2007.  One third of the council was up for election and no party won overall control of the council.  The winner of the Rosegrove with Lowerhouse ward had to be drawn by lot after the Labour and BNP candidates received an identical number of votes. Sam Holgate, the incumbent in the Rosegrove with Lowerhouse ward joined the Lib Dems in September 2006, being previously elected as an Independent.

After the election, the composition of the council was
Liberal Democrat 18
Labour 17
Conservative 6
British National Party 4

Election result

Ward results

References

2007 BBC News Burnley election result
Burnley Council 2007 Election Results

2007 English local elections
2007
2000s in Lancashire